Alec Farrall (born 3 March 1936) is an English former professional footballer. His clubs included Everton, Preston North End,  Gillingham, where he made over 200 Football League appearances, Lincoln City and Watford.

References

1936 births
Living people
English footballers
Gillingham F.C. players
Everton F.C. players
Preston North End F.C. players
Lincoln City F.C. players
Watford F.C. players
Association football midfielders